David Beatty, Beattie, or Beaty may refer to:

David Beatty, 1st Earl Beatty (1871–1936), British admiral
David Beatty, 2nd Earl Beatty (1905–1972), British politician, eldest son of the 1st Earl Beatty
David Beatty, 3rd Earl Beatty (born 1946), eldest son of the 2nd Earl Beatty
David L. Beatty (1798–1881), American politician, fifth mayor of Louisville, Kentucky (1841–1844)
David R. Beatty (born 1942), Canadian businessman
David Beattie (1924–2001), 14th Governor-General of New Zealand (1980–1985)
David Beattie (businessman) (born 1955), chairman of Partick Thistle F.C. and Chief Executive of Enterprise Foods Ltd.
David Beattie (footballer) (1903–?), Scottish footballer
David Beaty (American football) (born 1970), American football coach

See also
David Beaty (disambiguation)